Sunset is the most ethnically diverse neighbourhood in Vancouver, British Columbia. It is located in the south-east quadrant of the city. Surrounding the multicultural Fraser Street district, Sunset is bordered by both the Marpole and Oakridge neighbourhoods to the west, and the Victoria-Fraserview neighbourhood to the east. 

The neighbourhood is primarily known for the Punjabi Market and its historically large Punjabi-Canadian population.

History
Development of the Sunset neighbourhood first took place in the 1860s. At the time, the area was part of the District of South Vancouver and consisted mostly of farmland alongside a cluster of homes. Extensive logging took place along the south slope of Vancouver during the late 19th into early 20th century, prompting communities such as Sunset to rapidly industrialize.

In 1929, the District of South Vancouver amalgamated with the City of Vancouver, thus incorporating Sunset as a part of the city. The neighbourhood remained quite rural until the 1940s, when a large wave immigrants from central and eastern Europe moved into the area. Many new German immigrants established churches, most of which remain to this day.

In the 1960s, another large wave of immigrants moved into Sunset. Primarily Sikhs from the Punjab region of South Asia, the new immigrants founded the Punjabi Market on Main Street and presided over the last final large scale development in the neighbourhood with the construction of hundreds of Vancouver Specials. As most development in the area ceased in the 1980s, these homes continue to be a mainstay across southeast Vancouver.

Today, the neighbourhood is among the most ethnically diverse across Metro Vancouver and continues the serve as one of several centres of the South Asian community in Vancouver.

Geography
Sunset lies between E 41st Avenue, Ontario St,  Knight St and the Fraser River.

Commercial districts in Sunset are situated on Fraser Street between 41st and 51st avenues; named as Vancouver's most multicultural neighbourhood, the Fraser district features many South Asian, Chinese, Filipino and European businesses.

Another commercial district in Sunset is the Punjabi Market (also known as Little India) which is situated on Main Street and 49th Avenue.

Like most of south-east Vancouver, the area used to be predominantly working class but rising house prices elsewhere have made the area increasingly popular with young professionals and families who can no longer afford houses in areas such as the west side.

Demographics
The neighbourhood contains the largest South Asian (33.6%) and Punjabi speaking (23%) population in the city.

References

Neighbourhoods in Vancouver